The Finnish Mixed Doubles Curling Championship is the national championship of mixed doubles curling in Finland. It has been held annually since 2008.

List of champions and medallists

References

See also
Finnish Men's Curling Championship
Finnish Women's Curling Championship
Finnish Mixed Curling Championship
Finnish Junior Curling Championships
Finnish Wheelchair Curling Championship

Curling competitions in Finland
Curling

Recurring sporting events established in 2008
National curling championships